Halton (pronounced ) is a unitary authority district with borough status in Cheshire, North West England. It was created in 1974 as a district of the non-metropolitan county of Cheshire, and became a unitary authority area on 1 April 1998 under Halton Borough Council. Since 2014 it has been a member of the Liverpool City Region Combined Authority.  The borough consists of the towns of Runcorn and Widnes and the civil parishes of Daresbury, Hale, Halebank, Moore, Preston Brook,  and Sandymoor. The district borders Merseyside, the Borough of Warrington and Cheshire West and Chester.

History

Prior to 1974, the River Mersey marked the border between the counties of Lancashire to the north and Cheshire to the south. Widnes was administered by the Municipal Borough of Widnes in Lancashire, and Runcorn by Runcorn Urban District Council in Cheshire.

The 1969 Redcliffe-Maud Report recommended reforms to local government in England, including the abolition of all existing local government areas. They were to be replaced by mostly unitary authorities with the exception of three two-tier metropolitan areas to be called Merseyside, SELNEC and West Midlands. Runcorn and Widnes would form part of the new Merseyside Metropolitan Area under a district called 'St Helens-Widnes'.

The proposals were broadly accepted by the then Labour government but set aside by the incoming Conservative government following the 1970 general election which it had fought on a manifesto pledge to introduce a system of two-tier local government. The Local Government Act 1972 created new metropolitan counties around Liverpool (as Merseyside) and Manchester (as Greater Manchester) but Runcorn and Widnes would not be allocated to either. Instead, Widnes and Warrington would be moved into the non-metropolitan county of Cheshire, with Widnes joining Runcorn to create the new non-metropolitan district of Halton. The name of the new district was inspired by the ancient Barony of Halton which had possessed land on both sides of the river. The district was established on 1 April 1974. In addition to Runcorn Urban District and the Municipal Borough of Widnes, parts of Runcorn Rural District and the parish of Hale from Whiston Rural District were incorporated into Halton.

On 1 April 1998, Halton became a unitary authority, independent of Cheshire County Council. However, it continues to be served by Cheshire Police and Cheshire Fire and Rescue Service, and forms part of Cheshire for ceremonial purposes. On 1 April 2014, Halton became part of the Liverpool City Region Combined Authority, joining the local authorities of Liverpool, Sefton, Wirral, Knowsley and St Helens; the five metropolitan district councils which constitute the county of Merseyside. As a unitary authority, Halton's status is similar to the metropolitan district councils.

Demographics

Population growth
The change in population during the 20th century is shown in the following table.

Religion

In the 2011 census, Christianity was the main religion in Halton at 75%, well above the national average for England of 59.4%. 18.7% stated that they had "no religion". Those stating their religions as Buddhist, Hindu, Jewish, Islam or Sikh amounted to 0.8%.

Ethnicity
In the 2011 census, 97.8% of Halton residents identified as White and 2% were Non-White. From the 2011 School Census, the main first language apart from English was Polish.

Governance

Halton Borough Council is a unitary authority responsible for most local government functions within the area. The Labour Party has controlled the council since it was created in 1974.

On 1 April 2014, Halton became one of the six constituent local government districts of the Liverpool City Region under the Combined Authority.

Most of the borough is represented in the House of Commons by the member for Halton but Runcorn New Town is in the Weaver Vale constituency.

Economy

Halton is an industrial and logistics hub with a higher proportion of people working in manufacturing (particularly chemicals and advanced manufacturing), wholesale and retail, and transport and storage compared to the average for England.

The wages of employees in Halton are slightly higher than the average for England and significantly higher than the average for the North West and the Liverpool City Region. Business survival rates are also significantly higher than both the regional and national averages. In 2018, the GVA per head of population in Halton was £26,988
compared to a regional average of £22,244 in North West England.

Twin boroughs
Halton is twinned with:
 Marzahn-Hellersdorf, Berlin, Germany (since 25 May 1993)
 Ústí nad Labem, Ústí nad Labem Region, Czech Republic (since 13 October 1993)
 Leiria, Central Region, Portugal (since 1997)
 Tongling, Anhui,  China (since 1997)

Following an appeal in 1997, Halton residents donated 1,000 English books to Jan Evangelista Purkyně University in Ústí nad Labem. In 1999, an historic Halton Transport bus was restored and gifted to the Czech Republic to mark the centenary of public transport in the city. Engineers from Halton have assisted with chemical decontamination in the city and also when the city flooded in 2002.

The first crazy golf course in Berlin, created in Marzahn-Hellersdorf in 2005, contains several Halton landmarks and was constructed with the assistance of exchange students from the borough.

Several roads are named after Halton's twin boroughs, including Leiria Way in Runcorn and Marzahn Way in Widnes. A Chinese friendship garden was created in the grounds of Runcorn Town Hall in 2006, including a bronze statue gifted by the twin city of Tongling.

See also

List of schools in Halton
Listed buildings in Daresbury, Cheshire
Listed buildings in Hale, Halton
Listed buildings in Moore, Cheshire
Listed buildings in Preston Brook, Cheshire
Listed buildings in Runcorn, Cheshire
Listed buildings in Widnes, Cheshire

References

 
Liverpool City Region
Unitary authority districts of England
Districts of Cheshire
Districts of England established in 1974
Boroughs in England